Long Điền is a rural district of Bà Rịa–Vũng Tàu province in the Southeast region of Vietnam. As of 2003, the district had a population of 118,862. The district covers an area of 77 km². The district capital lies at Long Điền.

Administrative divisions
The district is divided administratively into 2 townships: Long Điền, the capital, and Long Hải, and 5 communes: An Ngãi, Tam Phước, An Nhất, Phước Hưng and Phước Tỉnh.

References

Districts of Bà Rịa-Vũng Tàu province
Bà Rịa-Vũng Tàu province